StatCounter is a web traffic analysis website started in 1999. StatCounter is based in Dublin, Ireland. The statistics from StatCounter are used to compute web usage share for example. , StatCounter is used on 0.9% of all websites.

StatCounter statistics are directly derived from hits—as opposed to unique visitors—from 3 million sites, which use StatCounter, resulting in total hits of more than 15 billion per month. No artificial weightings are used to correct for sampling bias, thus the numbers in the statistics can not be considered to be representative samples.

The company was founded by Aodhán Cullen at the age of 16. Cullen received the "Internet Hero" award at the 2008 Eircom Golden Spider Awards.  He was also named the 2007 BusinessWeek "Young European Entrepreneur of the Year".

See also 
 Alexa Traffic Rank

References

Online companies of Ireland
Web analytics
Companies based in Dublin (city)